François Perrenoud (born 21 November 1949) is a French speed skater. He competed in four events at the 1968 Winter Olympics.

References

1949 births
Living people
French male speed skaters
Olympic speed skaters of France
Speed skaters at the 1968 Winter Olympics
People from Vevey